Dossinia is a genus of flowering plants from the orchid family, Orchidaceae. At the present time (June 2014), only one species is accepted, Dossinia marmorata, endemic to Borneo.

See also
List of Orchidaceae genera

References

 Pridgeon, A.M., Cribb, P.J., Chase, M.A. & Rasmussen, F. eds. (1999). Genera Orchidacearum 1. Oxford Univ. Press.
 Pridgeon, A.M., Cribb, P.J., Chase, M.A. & Rasmussen, F. eds. (2001). Genera Orchidacearum 2. Oxford Univ. Press.
 Pridgeon, A.M., Cribb, P.J., Chase, M.A. & Rasmussen, F. eds. (2003). Genera Orchidacearum 3. Oxford Univ. Press
 Berg Pana, H. 2005. Handbuch der Orchideen-Namen. Dictionary of Orchid Names. Dizionario dei nomi delle orchidee. Ulmer, Stuttgart

External links

Orchids of Borneo
Cranichideae genera
Goodyerinae
Monotypic orchid genera
Taxa named by Charles François Antoine Morren